William Jay Grierson (born 27 April 1998) is a professional footballer who currently plays for United City. Born in Sai Ying Pun, Hong Kong to a British father and a Chinese Filipino mother, he has completed his tertiary education at the Ateneo de Manila University whilst representing the youth national team of the Philippines.

Career statistics

Club

Notes

References

1998 births
Living people
Hong Kong footballers
Citizens of the Philippines through descent
Filipino footballers
English footballers
Hong Kong people of English descent
Filipino people of English descent
Association football defenders
Ceres–Negros F.C. players